Wyandra is a town and a locality in the Shire of Paroo, Queensland, Australia.

Geography 
The Warrego River flows from north to south through the locality. The Mitchell Highway also passes from north to south through the locality to the east and roughly parallel with the river.

History 

The town was originally named Claverton in July 1896, after the Claverton Downs pastoral run on the Warrego River, which was established about 1860. However, it was renamed Wyandra later in 1896.

The town grew with the completion of the Western railway line from Charleville in 1897 and quickly became a centre for local grazing properties.

The Wyandra Provisional School opened on 10 February 1898 and became Wyandra State School on 1 January 1909.

In February 1921, the citizens of Wyandra erected a war memorial on the corner of Macks and Warrego Streets in honour of those residents of the district who served in the military during World War I. The memorial has a digger statue and lists the names of the 23 who enlisted and commemorates the three who died.

A powerhouse was established in 1955 with generators that came from Cunnamulla. Wyandra was connected to the state electricity grid in 1970. The obsolete powerhouse was placed on Standby and later converted into a museum.

Media 
Wyandra receives transmissions from the following radio stations:

 ABC Radio Western Queensland – 603 AM
 4VL (Resonate Radio) – 93.9 FM
 ABC Radio National – 106.1 FM

The Australian Broadcasting Corporation transmits ABC and its sister Channels, ABC Kids, ABC TV Plus, ABC Me and ABC NEWS to Wyandra through its Cunnamulla relay station, ABCAQ, situated at 28°2′54″S 145°42′6″E

The Seven Network and its sister channels 7Two, 7Mate and 7Flix transmit to Wyandra through its regional area affiliate, ITQ.

Network Ten and its sister channels 10 Bold, 10 Peach and 10 Shake transmit to Wyandra through its regional area affiliate, CDT

The Nine Network and its sister channels 9Gem, 9Go! and 9Rush transmit to Wyandra through its regional area affiliate, Imparja Television

The Special Broadcasting Service and its sister channels SBS Viceland, SBS World Movies and SBS Food also transmit to Wyandra.

Facilities
Paroo Shire Council operates Wyandra Library at Macks Street.

Wyandra has the Powerhouse Museum. The Wyandra hall has a park behind the hall and public toilets in front of the hall. There is a free caravan park behind the school.

Education 
Wyandra State School is a government primary (Early Childhood-6) school for boys and girls at Moody Street. In 2017, the school had an enrolment of 4 students with 1 teacher and 2 non-teaching staff (1 full-time equivalent).

References

Further reading

External links

 Town map of Wyandra, 1977
Paroo Shire Council – Wyandra – Official website
Community website
Images available on Google

Towns in Queensland
Shire of Paroo
Localities in Queensland